The Calabash International Literary Festival is a three-day festival in Jamaica staged on a biennial basis on even years (having been held annually in its first decade). It was founded in 2001 by novelist Colin Channer, poet Kwame Dawes and producer Justine Henzell; Channer resigned at the end of 2010, saying in his explanation: "The ultimate goal of leadership must never be its own survival, but to become obsolete. I am glad this time has come." In 2014 there was a larger international content including leading literary figures and musicians, and the current incarnation of the festival was described in April 2016 as "an affirmation of the steady movement towards an unfolding of a vision of something that began modestly, but full of hope and giddy ambition 15 years ago".

Now acknowledged as "a world-class literary festival", Calabash takes place in the village of Treasure Beach on Jamaica's south coast. Among the international authors who have taken part are Salman Rushdie, Zadie Smith, Jamaica Kincaid, Colum McCann, Wole Soyinka, Derek Walcott, Junot Diaz, Michael Ondaatje, Elizabeth Alexander, Russell Banks, Edwidge Danticat, Chimamanda Ngozi Adichie, Caryl Phillips, Linton Kwesi Johnson, Chigozie Obioma, Tishani Doshi, Mervyn Morris, Kei Miller, Marlon James, Eleanor Catton, and many others. 

An anthology entitled Much Things to Say: 100 Poets from the First Ten Years of the Calabash International Literary Festival was published in 2010.

In 2021, the Calabash festival won the Madam C.J. Walker Award from the Hurston/Wright Foundation.

Following cancellations due to the COVID-19 pandemic, the festival was scheduled to relaunch in May 2023.

References

External links
 "Info", Calabash website.
 "Calabash 2014 Highlight", YouTube.

Biennial events
Literary festivals in Jamaica
Recurring events established in 2001